Kenneth James Rymill (30 August 1906 – 31 May 1977) was an English cricketer. Rymill was a right-handed batsman. He was born at Northampton, Northamptonshire.

Rymill made his first-class debut for Northamptonshire against Dublin University in 1926 at the County Ground, Northampton. His next first-class appearance for the county came in 1932, against Somerset in the County Championship. He made two further first-class appearances in that season's County Championship, against Kent and Gloucestershire. In his four first-class matches for the county, he scored just 35 runs at an average of 5.83, with a high score of 28.

He died at the town of his birth on 31 May 1977.

References

External links
Kenneth Rymill at ESPNcricinfo
Kenneth Rymill at CricketArchive

1906 births
1977 deaths
Cricketers from Northampton
English cricketers
Northamptonshire cricketers